A floating suspension bridge is a type of suspension bridge supported by towers built on floating pontoons which are tethered to the seabed. The design is intended to overcome the difficulties of building suspension towers in locations where the water is particularly deep.  no such bridges have been built, but a project is underway to build one in Norway, at Bjørnafjord, designed by engineer Ian Firth.

See also
Floating cable-stayed bridge
Cable-stayed suspension bridge
Intercontinental and transoceanic fixed links
List of straits
Strait of Gibraltar
Straits of Tiran

References

Further reading
Floating suspension bridges - Long span bridges - Research - Structural Dynamics - Department of Structural Engineering - NTNU

https://www.vegvesen.no/vegprosjekter/ferjefriE39/konferanse/teknologidagene2015/_attachment/1023556?_ts=14ff54620d0&fast_title=11+-+Johannes+Veie++Presentation+of+TLP-concept+Teknologidagene.pdf 

Bridges by structural type

Structural engineering